Aquamicrobium lusatiense is a Gram-negative, oxidase-positive, strictly aerobic bacteria from the genus Aquamicrobium with a polar flagellum, which was isolated from activated sludge in Germany. Aquamicrobium lusatiense is able to degrade 2,4-dichlorophenol, 4-chloro-2-methylphenol, 4-chlorophenol, and phenol. Defluvibacter lusatiensis was transferred to Aquamicrobium lusatiense

References

External links
Type strain of Aquamicrobium lusatiense at BacDive -  the Bacterial Diversity Metadatabase

Phyllobacteriaceae
Bacteria described in 2009